NAO or nao may refer to:

Organisations
 National Academy Orchestra of Canada, a Canadian training orchestra
 National Applications Office, a former program of the United States Department of Homeland Security
 National Audit Office (disambiguation), in several nations
 Nautical Almanac Office (disambiguation)
 HM Nautical Almanac Office, in the United Kingdom
 Nautical Almanac Office, at the United States Naval Observatory
 New Age Outlaws, a wrestling tag team

Science and technology
 Sodium oxide (NaO)
 North Atlantic oscillation, a climatic phenomenon 
 Nao (robot), a humanoid robot developed by Aldebaran Robotics
 13221 Nao, an asteroid

People
 Nao (given name), a Japanese given name
 Nao (singer), a United Kingdom music artist

Places
 Näo, a village in Estonia
 Nao, Iran, a village in Kurdistan Province
 Nenets Autonomous Okrug, a federal subdivision of Russia

Other uses
 Carrack, a sailing ship known as a nao in Spanish
 Nanchong Gaoping Airport (IATA code), an airport in China
 Carrack (Spanish: nao), a sailing ship
 Nao (musical instrument) (鐃), see List of Chinese musical instruments
 Nao, a fictional character in the Aquablue comic
 Nao Porcelain, a brand owned by Lladro